26 Aquarii is a single star located approximately 960 light years away from the Sun in the zodiac constellation of Aquarius. 26 Aquarii is the Flamsteed designation. It is visible to the naked eye as a dim, orange-hued star with an apparent visual magnitude of 5.66. This object is moving away from the Earth with a heliocentric radial velocity of +8 km/s.

Houk and Swift (1999) listed a stellar classification of K2(III) for 26 Aquarii, corresponding to an evolved K-type giant of uncertain luminosity class. It has 54.5 times the Sun's radius and is radiating 842 times the luminosity of the Sun from its photosphere at an effective temperature of 4,210 K.

References

K-type giants
Aquarius (constellation)
Durchmusterung objects
Aquarii, 026
206445
107144
8287